Couchbase, Inc. is an American public (NASDAQ symbol BASE) software company that develops and provides commercial packages and support for Couchbase Server and Couchbase Lite both of which are open-source, NoSQL, multi-model, document-oriented database software packages that store JSON documents or a pure key-value database. The company has its headquarters in Santa Clara, California, and offices in San Francisco, Austin, Texas, Bangalore and the United Kingdom.

History
NorthScale was founded in 2009, and in March 2010 announced $5 million in funding from Accel Partners and North Bridge Venture Partners.
Original officers listed were James Phillips, Steve Yen and Dustin Sallings, who were involved in the development of memcached.
In May 2010, a $10 million investment led by the Mayfield Fund was announced for NorthScale, and Bob Wiederhold replaced Phillips as chief executive.
Some time later in 2010, NorthScale was renamed Membase, Incorporated.

CouchOne Inc. was also founded in 2009 as Relaxed, in Berkeley, California. It developed and provided commercial support for the Apache CouchDB open source project, a document database. 
Initial funding was $2 million, including investor Redpoint Ventures.
Couchbase, Inc. was created through the merger of Membase and CouchOne in February 2011. The merged company aimed to build an easily scalable, high-performance document-oriented database system, marketed with the term NoSQL.

In August 2011, a $14 million funding was led by Ignition Partners.
In October 2011, DoCoMo Capital  announced an investment of $1 million was part of that round.
In August, 2013, another round of $25 million was led by Adams Street Partners.
A round of $60 million in June, 2014, included new investor WestSummit.
A round of $30 million in March, 2016, was reported as giving a reduced valuation to the company.
Peter Finter became chief marketing officer in September 2016. Matt Cain replaced Bob Wiederhold as CEO in April 2017. 

Recognition include the 2012 Infoworld Bossie award, Dataweek 2012 award, Always-On Global award, VentureWire's 50 FASTTech companies  
, GigaOM's Structure 50 list  and the Gartner cool vendor award.

References

NoSQL
Free database management systems
Structured storage
Companies based in Mountain View, California
Companies established in 2011
2021 initial public offerings